Orlando "Orly" Bauzon (November 17, 1944 – September 5, 2020) was a Filipino basketball player and coach.

Early life
Bauzon was born on November 17, 1944 in Calasiao, Pangasinan in the Philippines during the later years of the Japanese occupation of the islands during the World War II era.

Playing career

Collegiate
Bauzon played for the men's basketball collegiate varsity team of the University of Santo Tomas (UST).

MICAA
In the MICAA, he played for the multi-titled Ysmael Steel Admirals, the Meralco Reddy Kilowatts, and the Komatsu Komets/Toyota Comets.

Bauzon joined Toyota in its first MICAA tournament in 1973 and was instrumental in securing his team a place in the final with his last second shot in the semifinal. Toyota won against the Concepcion Motorolas in the final.

PBA
He continued with Toyota when the franchise transferred to the PBA. He ended his playing career with the Mariwasa Honda Wildcats (1978).

National team
Bauzon also played for the Philippine national team and competed at the 1968 Summer Olympics in Mexico City. He also represented the country at the 1970 Asian Games in Bangkok and the 1967 ABC Championship in Seoul. In the latter, the Philippines won the title besting hosts South Korea in the de facto final.

Coaching career
After his retirement from competitive basketball as player in 1978, he has coached various collegiate teams. He has coached his alma mater UST during UAAP Season 51 in 1988 where his squad finished seventh and Adamson University which he led to the UAAP Season 55 finals in 1992 where Adamson faced eventual champions Far Eastern University. He has also mentored the University of the Philippines in 1995 and the Pangasinan Presidents of the Metropolitan Basketball Association in 1998.

Death
Bauzon died on September 5, 2020 in Pampanga due to cardiac arrest at age 75.

Personal life
Bauzon was married to Josie Bauzon who was the first female Philippine Sports Commission commissioner. His wife died in 2011.

References

External links
 

1944 births
2020 deaths
Olympic basketball players of the Philippines
UST Growling Tigers basketball players
Basketball players at the 1968 Summer Olympics
Philippines men's national basketball team players
Filipino men's basketball players
Toyota Super Corollas players
Basketball players from Pangasinan
Basketball players at the 1970 Asian Games
Asian Games competitors for the Philippines